Fíjate Bien (Spanish for Pay Attention) is the debut studio album recorded by Colombian singer-songwriter Juanes, It was released by Surco Records on October 17, 2000 (see 2000 in music). The album was produced by Gustavo Santaolalla, who is known for his contributions to Latin rock tracks. All the songs on the album were written by Juanes himself. The strings were arranged, orchestrated and conducted by David Campbell, who has also worked on several other albums by Juanes. The album received six Latin Grammy Award nominations in 2001 including Album of the Year, Record of the Year and Song of the Year, Best Short Form Music Video for Fijate Bien; Best Rock Solo Vocal Album and Best New Artist winning the later two.

The album was certified Disco de Platino by the RIAA on June 23, 2003, for shipping 100,000 copies.

Track listing
"Ahí le Va" (There It Goes) – 3:27
"Para Ser Eterno" (To Be Eternal) – 5:04
"Volcán" (Volcano) – 3:33
"Podemos Hacernos Daño" (We Could Hurt Each Other) – 3:46
"Destino" (Destiny) – 3:33
"Nada" (Nothing) – 3:53
"Fíjate Bien" (Focus) – 4:55
"Vulnerable" (Vulnerable) – 4:27
"Soñador" (Dreamer) – 3:25
"Ficcion" (Fiction) – 4:14
"¿Para Qué?" (What For?) – 3:35
"Me da Igual" (I Don't Mind) – 4:12

Videoclips
"Podemos Hacernos Daño"
"Nada"
"Fíjate Bien"

Bonus tracks edition 

"De Madrugada" (In the Dawn) – 3:50
"Sin Rencores" (Without Resentment) – 3:03
"Solo" (Alone) – 4:56
"Raza" (Race) – 3:15
"La Decision" (The Decision) – 5:33
"La Tierra" (The Land) – 3:48

Chart performance

Certifications and sales

References

2000 albums
Juanes albums
Universal Music Latino albums
Spanish-language albums
Latin Grammy Award for Best Rock Solo Vocal Album
Albums produced by Gustavo Santaolalla

el:Fijate bien